The 1999 Internationaux de Strasbourg singles was the singles event of the thirteenth edition of the Internationaux de Strasbourg, a WTA Tier III tournament held in Strasbourg, France and part of the European clay court season. Irina Spîrlea was the champion from the previous year's edition of this tournament, but she did not partake in defence.

Entering as the World No. 113 and a former World No. 6 from 1991, Jennifer Capriati won her first tournament since 1993 without losing a set, defeating Russian second seed Elena Likhovtseva in the final.

Seeds
The top two seeds received a bye to the second round.

Draw

Finals

Top half

Bottom half

Qualifying

Seeds

Qualifiers

Lucky loser
  Jolene Watanabe

Qualifying draw

First qualifier

Second qualifier

Third qualifier

Fourth qualifier

External links
 1999 Internationaux de Strasbourg Draw
 1999 Internationaux de Strasbourg Singles Qualifying Draw

1999
Internationaux de Strasbourg
1999 in French sport